B. Kothakota is a Town in Annamayya district of the Indian state of Andhra Pradesh. It is the mandal headquarters of B. Kotha kota mandal.

References 

Villages in Annamayya district
Mandal headquarters in Annamayya district